The Canada national baseball team represents Canada in international baseball. They are overseen by Baseball Canada, the governing body of baseball in Canada. 

Canada was an inaugural member of the World Baseball Classic, making its debut in the first edition. They have yet to make it past the first round.

Team

Current roster 
The roster for the 2023 World Baseball Classic

Recent call-ups

Results and fixtures
The following is a list of professional baseball match results currently active in the latest version of the WBSC World Rankings, as well as any future matches that have been scheduled.

Legend

2019

2023

Competitive record

World Baseball Classic

2006 WBC: Inaugural classic

In June 2005, Major League Baseball announced the formation of the World Baseball Classic (WBC), an international competition to be held in March 2006 for the first time. Canada was one of the sixteen teams invited to play in the inaugural classic. Because the event will be held in March, before the North American baseball season traditionally starts, players active in Major League Baseball or any minor league affiliates are eligible to play in the WBC, making the team markedly different from the teams which represented Canada in the 2005 World Cup or the 2004 Olympics.

Several high-profile Canadian players declined the opportunity to participate, including Ryan Dempster, Shawn Hill, Danny Klassen, Éric Gagné and Rich Harden, who were injured.  Los Angeles Dodgers' prospect Russell Martin was named to the team, but pulled out in favor of reporting to Spring training. In addition, Larry Walker, who retired after the 2005 season, opted not to participate, choosing instead to serve in a coaching capacity.

Canada played in Pool B of the tournament with Mexico, South Africa and the United States.

Team Canada was heavily favoured to win their first game against South Africa, a team made up almost entirely by amateurs. However, South Africa put up a tough challenge to the Canadian team. South African starter, Carl Michaels pitched outstandingly; Canada could not get a run until the 5th inning, when they scored 3. However, the South Africans shockingly scored 4 runs of their own in the bottom of the 5th against Paul Quantrill. It was back and forth from then on. It looked like South Africa might pull off a monumental upset as they went into the 9th with an 8–7 lead. However, in the top of the 9th, the Canadians scored 4 times to win the game 11–8.
After almost being upset by a surprising South African team, Canada pulled off an upset of its own with an 8-6 victory over the star-studded United States team. Scoring in each of the first five innings, the Canadians built an 8–0 lead using a combination of timely, patient hitting, steady pitching and clutch fielding. In the bottom of the fifth, the United States threatened a comeback, exploding for 6 runs, capped off by a Jason Varitek grand slam. The Canadian team held off the US the rest of the way, as neither team crossed the plate again in the game. Adam Stern had a strong outing, going 3 for 4, a double shy of the cycle, with an inside-the-park home run, as well as making several spectacular plays in center field to keep his team ahead.

After Canada's victory over the United States, they got shocked by the Mexican team in a 9–1 resounding defeat.  Unfortunately for the Canadian side, this victory would eventually cost them the trip to the 2nd round of the tournament after the United States beat South Africa 17–0 and clinched the second place in Pool B. Canada, USA, and Mexico each finished with a 2–1 record in the pool, but Canada lost the tie-breaker based on runs allowed.

2009 WBC: First classic held on home soil

Canada was placed in 2009 World Baseball Classic – Pool C hosting the United States, Italy, and Venezuela at Rogers Centre in Toronto. In their opener, Canada lost a close game against the United States by a score of 6–5. On March 9, Canada was eliminated from the tournament after losing 6–2 to underdog Italy. Canada exited the WBC with an 0–2 record and 6.35 runs allowed per 9 innings, to secure thirteenth place overall.

2013 WBC: Brawl vs Mexico

Canada qualified by winning a qualifying tournament in Armin-Wolf-Arena in Regensburg, Germany, in September 2012, that also featured the Czech Republic, Germany and Great Britain. Canada moved on to the 1st Round.

The Canadian team was placed in 2013 World Baseball Classic – Pool D against Italy, Mexico and the United States. In their opener, Canada lost to the Italian baseball team 14–4 after the game ended in the 8th inning due to the mercy rule in place after Italy scored five additional runs during the bottom of the 8th inning. On March 9, Canada faced off against Mexico. With Canada already leading the game, third baseman Luis Cruz motioned the pitcher Arnold Leon to bean the next batter, Rene Tosoni, which resulted in a bench clearing brawl. Seven players from both teams ejected from the game. Despite this, they clinched a 10–3 win over Mexico. They lost the final game against the United States 9–4, thus eliminating Canada from the tournament. 

The Canadian team missed out on advancing to the next round for the third time, but still managed to claim their automatic qualification for the 2017 World Baseball Classic.

2017 WBC: Worst finish

Canada was placed in 2017 World Baseball Classic – Pool C against the Dominican Republic, Colombia, and the United States. Their performances were abysmal, even losting to surprising debutants Colombia. 

After losing all three of its matches, they finished last in their group, and were forced to go through qualifiers for the 2023 World Baseball Classic.

2023 WBC

Canada automatically qualified for the 2023 tournament by playing in the 2017 World Baseball Classic.

The Canadian team was placed in 2023 World Baseball Classic – Pool C against Great Britain, United States, Columbia and Mexico. They began pool play with a dominant 18–8 win over Great Britain. In Game 2, roles were reversed when they lost 1–12 against the United States. In Game 3 against Columbia, Canada led 1–0 going into the eighth inning, but Otto Lopez, a Toronto Blue Jays prospect, led off the inning with a triple and was driven in by Owen Caissie's two-out RBI single to push the lead to 2–0. Lopez's three-run shot in the ninth gave Canada an even bigger cushion, which ultimately lead them to winning 5–0. Their 2–1 record setup a win-or-go-home game vs Mexico. After a good start to the game, Mexico blew the game open with a four-run sixth, keyed by Randy Arozarena’s three-run double. They would go on to win the game 10–3, ultimately eliminating Canada from the tournament.

By finishing top four in their group, Canada still managed to claim their automatic qualification spot for the 2026 World Baseball Classic.

Olympic Games

Background 
Canada has qualified for two Olympic Games, in 2004 and 2008. Canadian teams also competed twice when baseball was a demonstration sport, in 1984 and 1988.

1984 Summer Olympics: Inaugural tournament

Canada was invited to participate at the 1984 Summer Olympics. They finished with a 1–2 record in pool play, and did not advance to the knockout round. They finished tied for third in their pool, the equivalent of a tie for fifth overall.

1988 Summer Olympics: Missing the knockout stage

Canada qualified for the 1988 Summer Olympics by finishing in fourth place at the 1987 Pan American Games and defeating 1987 European Baseball Championship silver medalist Italy in a playoff. They finished with a 1–2 record in pool play, and did not advance to the knockout round. They finished in seventh place overall.

2004 Summer Olympics: Fourth place finish

Canada qualified for the 2004 Summer Olympics by finishing second at the Americas Olympic Qualifying Tournament in Panama. They finished with a 5–2 record in pool play, then fell to Cuba in the semifinals. Canada would ultimately lose the Bronze Medal game 11–2 to Japan.

2008 Summer Olympics: Missing the knockout round

Canada qualified for the 2008 Summer Olympics by finishing first in the Final Qualifying Tournament. They finished with 2–5 record in pool play, and did not advance to the knockout round.

WBSC Premier12

2015 WBSC Premier12: Inaugural event 
Canada was placed in Pool A against Cuba, Netherlands, Puerto Rico, Italy, and host Chinese Taipei. They completed a perfect 5–0 pool play to advance to the playoff stage. They ultimately lost to Mexico 4–3 in the quarter-finals, finishing in fifth place overall.

2019 WBSC Premier12: Stiffer competition 
Two quota spots were allocated from the Tournament, of the spots for six baseball teams at the 2020 Olympic Games. 

Canada was placed in Pool C against Australia, Cuba, and host South Korea. They compiled a 1–2 pool play record, and did not advance to the Super Round. They finished in seventh place overall

Amateur World Series and Baseball World Cup 

Canada has competed at 9 World Cups and 8 more times in its predecessor the Amateur World series. Their best finish was a bronze at the 2009 World Cup and at the 2011 World Cup.

Pan American Games
Canada's first appearance at the Pan American Games came in 1967. Their first medal came in 1999, when the team won the bronze medal for their third-place finish. In 2011, Canada won the gold medal game over the United States, 2–1, to win Canada's first-ever baseball gold medal. Canada won their second consecutive gold medal in 2015, defeating the United States, 7–6 (10 innings), in the final. In 2019, Canada won the silver medal, losing to Puerto Rico in the final match.

Haarlem Baseball Week

World Port Tournament

Uniforms

See also
List of Major League Baseball players from Canada
World Port Tournament

References

External links 

National Teams at Baseball Canada